Joone is an American entrepreneur, photographer, director and producer. For directing pornographic films, he won AVN Award twice. In 1993, Joone founded American pornographic movie studio Digital Playground and was a co-owner of the company until it was acquired by Manwin in 2012.

Career

He founded the Digital Playground company in 1993 when he was 25 and still a student, initially making adult CD-ROM computer games.

Commenting on the transition of the pornography industry from the underground economy to mainstream corporate acceptance, the company's founder said: "I look at the porn business where Vegas and gambling was in the 70's… Vegas was still mob-owned and they were making the transition between these small groups of people to being corporate owned… I feel the same exact thing is going to happen with adult".

Joone has directed the pornographic films Pirates and Pirates II: Stagnetti's Revenge.

In January 2012, alongside his ex-wife Samantha Lewis—who was co-owner, CEO and President of Digital Playground—he reached an agreement with Fabian Thylmann to sell the company to Manwin. On the acquisition, Joone commented: "To me this deal is no different than the acquisition of Pixar by Disney, The consumer is going to see more blockbusters, big-budget productions, and it's our goal to create the next genre of adult entertainment. This acquisition is a marriage between two industry leaders. Adult entertainment is changing and Manwin has a lead on technology." The price or terms of the deal was not disclosed, but it was announced that Lewis and Joone will "continue to oversee the studio"; however, it was reported in March that Manwin had released Lewis and some other employees.

Other ventures 
Joone is co-owner of "Diosa Spirits" tequila, Jesse Jane and her husband Rich.

Partial filmography

As director 
 Pirates 
 Pirates II: Stagnetti's Revenge
 Island Fever 1, 2, 3 & 4
 Forbidden Tales
 Virtual Sex line of DVDs:
 Virtual Sex with Jesse Jane
 Virtual Sex with Taylor Hayes
 Virtual Sex with Tera Patrick
 Virtual Sex with Jenna Jameson
 Rocki Roads' Wet Dreams

Awards and nominations
 2006 AVN Award – Best Director, Video (Pirates)
 2006 XRCO Award winner - Best Director
 2009 AVN Award winner – Best Director, Feature (Pirates II)
 2009 AVN Award winner – Best Screenplay (Pirates II) shared with Max Massimo
 2009 AVN Award winner – Best Videography (Pirates II) shared with Oliver Henry
 2009 Eroticline Awards winner - Best U.S. Director
 2009 Hot d'Or Award winner - Best American Screenplay (Pirates II: Stagnetti's Revenge - Digital Playground)
 2009 Hot d'Or Award winner - Best American Movie (Pirates II: Stagnetti's Revenge - Digital Playground)

References

External links
 
 
 Adult Film Database

Living people
Year of birth missing (living people)
American pornographic film directors
American photographers
American sex industry businesspeople
University of Southern California alumni
American film producers
American people of Iranian descent